Gila County is in the central part of the U.S. state of Arizona. As of the 2020 census, the population was 53,272. The county seat is Globe.

Gila County comprises the Payson, Arizona Micropolitan Statistical Area.

Gila County contains parts of Fort Apache Indian Reservation and San Carlos Indian Reservation.

History
The county was formed from parts of Maricopa and Pinal counties on February 8, 1881. The boundary was then extended eastward to the San Carlos River by public petition in 1889. The original county seat was in the mining community of Globe City, now Globe.

Popular theory holds that the word "Gila" was derived from a Spanish contraction of Hah-quah-sa-eel, a Yuma word meaning "running water which is salty".

In the 1880s, a long range war broke out in Gila County that became the most costly feud in American history, resulting in an almost complete annihilation of the families involved.  The Pleasant Valley War (also sometimes called the Tonto Basin Feud or Tonto Basin War) matched the cattle-herding Grahams against the sheep-herding Tewksburys. Once partisan feelings became tense and hostilities began, Frederick Russell Burnham, who later became a celebrated scout and the inspiration for the boy scouts, was drawn into the conflict on the losing side. 

Burnham shot many men in the feud, and was himself nearly killed by a bounty hunter. Tom Horn, an infamous assassin, was known to have taken part as a killer for hire, but it is unknown which side employed him. Both sides suffered fatalities. No one was ever charged or prosecuted.

In the 1960s, it was home of Gerald Gault, who was the subject of the 1967 U.S. Supreme Court ruling, in re Gault, that stated juveniles have the same rights as adults when arrested to be notified of the charges against them, the rights to attorneys, for family members to be notified of their arrests and to confront their accusers and to not be punished more harshly than adults who are convicted of the same crime, especially if an adult's penalty for the crime would be less than that accorded a juvenile convict.

Geography

Adjacent counties
 Yavapai County – northwest-north
 Maricopa County – west
 Pinal County – south
 Graham County – south
 Navajo County – east, northeast
 Coconino County – north

National protected areas
 Coconino National Forest (part)
 Tonto National Forest (part)
 Tonto National Monument

Demographics

2000 census
As of the census of 2000, there were 51,335 people, 20,140 households, and 14,098 families living in the county.  The population density was 11 people per square mile (4/km2).  There were 28,189 housing units at an average density of 6 per square mile (2/km2).  The racial makeup of the county was 77.8% White, 0.4% Black or African American, 12.9% Native American, 0.4% Asian, 0.2% Pacific Islander, 6.6% from other races, and 1.8% from two or more races.  16.7% of the population were Hispanic or Latino of any race. 9.8% reported speaking Spanish at home, while 6.3% speak Western Apache.

There were 20,140 households, out of which 26.3% had children under the age of 18 living with them, 55.1% were married couples living together, 10.8% had a female householder with no husband present, and 30.0% were non-families. 25.8% of all households were made up of individuals, and 12.3% had someone living alone who was 65 years of age or older.  The average household size was 2.50 and the average family size was 2.99.

In the county, the population was spread out, with 25.1% under the age of 18, 6.4% from 18 to 24, 22.3% from 25 to 44, 26.4% from 45 to 64, and 19.8% who were 65 years of age or older.  The median age was 42 years. For every 100 females there were 96.8 males.  For every 100 females age 18 and over, there were 94.2 males.

The median income for a household in the county was $30,917, and the median income for a family was $36,593. Males had a median income of $31,579 versus $22,315 for females. The per capita income for the county was $16,315.  About 12.6% of families and 17.4% of the population were below the poverty line, including 25.9% of those under age 18 and 7.9% of those age 65 or over.

2010 census
As of the census of 2010, there were 53,597 people, 22,000 households, and 14,294 families living in the county. The racial makeup of the county was 76.8% white, 14.8% American Indian, 0.5% Asian, 0.4% black or African American, 0.1% Pacific islander, 5.3% from other races, and 2.0% from two or more races. Those of Hispanic or Latino origin made up 17.9% of the population. In terms of ancestry, 17.4% were German, 13.3% were English, 11.4% were Irish, and 3.4% were American.

Of the 22,000 households, 25.3% had children under the age of 18 living with them, 48.6% were married couples living together, 11.1% had a female householder with no husband present, 35.0% were non-families, and 29.3% of all households were made up of individuals. The average household size was 2.39 and the average family size was 2.94. The median age was 47.9 years.

The median income for a household in the county was $37,580 and the median income for a family was $46,292. Males had a median income of $41,698 versus $30,023 for females. The per capita income for the county was $19,600. About 11.6% of families and 18.9% of the population were below the poverty line, including 27.4% of those under age 18 and 10.0% of those age 65 or over.

Politics
Historically, Gila County was a Democratic-leaning county in largely-Republican Arizona – for example, it voted for Adlai Stevenson II in 1952, Hubert Humphrey in 1968 and (very narrowly in a three-way contest) for John W. Davis in 1924. In much of the “dealignment” period from 1960 to 1980, when Arizona was the only state never carried by a Democrat, Gila was the second most-Democratic county in Arizona, behind massively unionized Greenlee. Only during very large Presidential landslides was Gila County carried by Republicans before 2000: indeed, apart from Ronald Reagan in 1980 and Richard Nixon in 1972, no Republican before 2000 ever carried the county by more than seven percentage points.

Since 2000, however, like Greenlee County, Gila County has trended heavily towards the Republican Party, and Hillary Clinton’s 2016 performance was the worst ever by a Democratic presidential nominee. Moreover, Barack Obama did worse here in 2008 than John Kerry did in 2004, one of a few non-Ozark or non-Appalachian counties where this occurred (possibly due to Arizona Senator John McCain's presence on the ballot).

Gila County was covered in the papers as the site of a confluence between politics and public health as the conservatism of the county (with Democrat Joe Biden losing by 34 points in the 2020 presidential election) was considered one reason for vaccine skepticism, allowing the county to distribute COVID-19 vaccines to all adults well before other areas in the US.

Transportation

Major highways
  U.S. Route 60
  U.S. Route 70
  State Route 77
  State Route 87
  State Route 188
  State Route 260

Airports
The following public-use airports are located in the county:
 Payson Airport in Payson
 San Carlos Apache Airport near Globe

Communities

City
 Globe (county seat)

Towns
 Hayden (partly in Pinal County)
 Miami
 Payson
 Star Valley
 Winkelman (partly in Pinal County)

Census-designated places

 Bear Flat
 Beaver Valley
 Canyon Day
 Carrizo
 Cedar Creek
 Central Heights-Midland City
 Christopher Creek
 Claypool
 Copper Hill
 Cutter
 Deer Creek
 Dripping Springs
 East Globe
 East Verde Estates
 El Capitan
 Flowing Springs
 Freedom Acres
 Geronimo Estates
 Gisela
 Haigler Creek
 Hunter Creek
 Icehouse Canyon
 Jakes Corner
 Kohls Ranch
 Mead Ranch
 Mesa del Caballo
 Oxbow Estates
 Peridot
 Pinal
 Pine
 Rock House
 Roosevelt
 Roosevelt Estates
 Round Valley
 Rye
 San Carlos
 Six Shooter Canyon
 Strawberry
 Tonto Basin
 Tonto Village
 Top-of-the-World
 Washington Park
 Wheatfields
 Whispering Pines
 Young

Other communities
 Inspiration
 Punkin Center

Ghost towns 

Bellevue
 McMillenville

Indian communities
 Fort Apache Indian Reservation
 San Carlos Apache Indian Reservation
 Tonto Apache

County population ranking
The population ranking of the following table is based on the 2010 census of Gila County.

† county seat

Notable people
 David Gowan

See also
 National Register of Historic Places listings in Gila County, Arizona
 Needle's Eye Wilderness

References

External links
 
 County website

 
Arizona placenames of Native American origin
1881 establishments in Arizona Territory
Populated places established in 1881